The provisional president of the Senate of the Argentine Nation, commonly known as the provisional president, is the highest-ranking official in the Argentine Senate, the upper chamber of the National Congress of Argentina barring the presence of the titular president of the Senate, the vice president of Argentina.

the provisional president of the Senate is second in the line of succession to the presidency in Argentina. This official is elected by his or her peers at the outset of each legislative year, which per governing statutes takes place during the first ten days of December. Minority parties in the chamber elect three vice presidents.

List of provisional presidents

References

External links
Official website of the Argentine Senate (in Spanish)

Argentine Senate
Lists of members of the Argentine Senate